Faredoon A. Irani was an Indian cinematographer who worked in Hindi films. He shot Mehboob Khan's films Andaz (1949),  Aan (1952) and Mother India  (1958).

During his career, he won the Filmfare Award for Best Cinematographer record two times, for Mother India  (1958) and Duniya (1970).

Career
In 1935, he shot Mehboob Khan's directorial debut film, Judgement of Allah (1935), which in turn was inspired by The Sign of the Cross (1932) by Cecil B. DeMille. Subsequently he shot all Mehboob Khan films, including Anmol Ghadi (1946),  Andaz (1949), Aan (1952) - India's first technicolor film,  Amar (1954) and Mother India  (1958), which not only got him critical acclaim, but also his first Filmfare Award.

A leading cinematographer of his time,  he also presided over the meeting which led to the formation of Western India Cinematographers' Association (WICA) on 2 August 1953 in Mumbai.

Filmography
 Narsinh Mehta (1932, Gujarati)
 Grihalaxmi (1934)
 Vengeance is Mine (1935
 Dr. Madhurika (1935)
 Al Hilal a.k.a. Judgement of Allah (1935)
 Deccan Queen (1936)
 Grama Kanya a.k.a. Village Girl (1936)
 Manmohan (1936)
 Kokila (1937)
 Teen Sau Din Ke Baad (1938)
 Ek Hi Raasta (1939)
 Aurat (1940)
 Bahen (1941)
 Roti (1942)
 Najma (1943)
Humayun (1945)
 Anmol Ghadi (1946)
 Anokhi Ada (1948)
 Andaz (1949)
 Aan (1952)
 Amar (1954)
 Mother India  (1958) 
 Palki (1967) 
 Aadmi (1968)
 Duniya (1968)
 Gambler (1971)

Awards

 Filmfare Award for  Best Cinematographer
 1958: Mother India   
 1970: Duniya

References

External links
 
 Faredoon A. Irani at Upperstall

Hindi film cinematographers
Filmfare Awards winners
Irani people
Living people
Year of birth missing (living people)